The Teles Pires Dam is a run-of-the-river hydroelectric dam on the Teles Pires River,  upstream of the confluence with the Tapajós river, on the border of the Brazilian states of Mato Grosso and Pará.  The  dam impounds a  reservoir ( original riverbed and  inundated area), 84% in Mato Grosso state (Paranaíta district) and 16% in Para state (Jacareacanga district).

The dam is part of a planned six-power-plant "Hidrovia Tapajos/Teles Pires" project to create a navigable waterway connecting the interior of Brazil to the Atlantic Ocean. The waterway will consist of six dams on the Teles Pires river—the  Magessi Dam,  Sinop Dam,  Colider Dam,  Teles Pires Dam, and  Sao Manoel Dam—and the  Foz do Apiacas Dam on the Apiacas river. Smaller upstream dams are still in the planning stages.

Design

Impacts
Brazilian law requires water impoundments to undergo an approval process to ensure that each project meets environmental, social, political, and safety criteria.

Social
The most frequent objection is that the dam builders failed to adequately consult with indigenous peoples, as required by law. The Brazilian government indigenous protection foundation FUNAI predicts that there may be un-contacted indigenous populations in the region that will be affected by the dam.  On March 30, 2012, a judge suspended construction of the Teles Pires Dam to preserve a waterfall that is considered sacred by an indigenous tribe.

Environmental
The Teles Pires Dam does not impound a large reservoir because it is a run-of-the-river project.  The dam also feature significant environmental remediation efforts.  As a consequence, there has not been strong environmental opposition to the implementation of the Teles Pires Dam.
On 17 March 2015 an agreement was made to compensate the public for the irreversible negative environmental impacts of the project through payment of R$500,000 for use by the Sucunduri State Park.

See also

List of power stations in Brazil

References

Dams in Mato Grosso
Hydroelectric power stations in Brazil
Run-of-the-river power stations
Roller-compacted concrete dams
Gravity dams
Dams in Pará